Jules Pizzetta (1820–1900) was the pseudonym of a French naturalist and author, J.-P. Houzé.

Publications

Science 
 Quinze jours au bord de la mer: flâneries d'un naturaliste (1845), Paris: Dupray de la Mahérie
 Encyclopédie nationale des sciences, des lettres et des arts, 4 vols. (1851, with Louis Barré), Paris: J. Bry
 Online: vol. 1; vol. 2; vol. 3; vol. 4.
 Dictionnaire populaire d'histoire naturelle et des phénomènes de la nature (1857), J. Martinon
 Dictionnaire populaire illustré d'histoire naturelle (1890),  introduction by Edmond Perrier, A. Hennuyer, XL+1164 p.—2nd ed. (1905)
 La botanique des écoles, petit traité de physique végétale (1862), P. Dupont
 Les secrets de la plage (1869), Paris: P. Brunet
 Le monde avant le Déluge (1869), Paris: P. Brunet—Digitizations: Google Books; archive.org
 El mundo antes del diluvio (1888) 
 Histoire d'une feuille de papier (1870), Paris: P. Brunet—Digitizations: Gallica ; Google Books
 Storia d'un foglio di carta (1873) 
 Historia de un pliego de papel (1887) 
 L'aquarium d'eau douce—d'eau de mer (1872), J. Rothschild
 Les voyages d'une goutte d'eau (1872), A. Rigaud
 Le monde polaire (1877), A. Rigaud
 Le trésor de la famille, encyclopédie des connaissances utiles dans la vie pratique (1877), J. Rothschild
 La pisciculture fluviale et maritime en France: culture de l'écrevisse et des sangsues (1880) (in the same volume as L'ostréiculture et la pêche côtière en France by Ferdinand François De Bon), Paris: J. Rothschild
 Les veillées de Jean Rustique, simples entretiens sur les animaux utiles et les animaux nuisibles (1880), P. Dupont
 Le livre des métiers manuels[…] (1882), G. Samson
 Le feu et l'eau (1884), Paris: A. Hennuyer
 Petit manuel de photographie pratique à l'usage des gens du monde (1891), Paris: A. Hennuyer
 Galerie des naturalistes: histoire des sciences naturelles, Paris: A. Hennuyer (1894)—Digitizations: archive.org; Google Books
 Les loisirs d'un campagnard—Digitizations of the 2nd ed.: archive.org ; biodiversitylibrary.org
 Plantes et bêtes, causeries familières sur l'histoire naturelle (1894), Paris: A. Hennuyer
 Boulogne et Calais: la baie de Somme: les étapes d'un touriste en France (1897)
 Reprint: Le Livre d'histoire (2001)
 Excerpt: Promenades en baie de Somme (2005), la Découvrance éd.

Libretto 
 Pauvre Venise!, lyrics by Jules Pizzetta, music by Melle Émilie Pizzetta

References

External links
 

French naturalists
1820 births
1900 deaths
French male writers